Felipponea elongata is a species of large freshwater snail with an operculum, an aquatic gastropod mollusk in the family Ampullariidae, the apple snail family.

The original description 
Felipponea elongata was originally discovered and described (under the name Ampullaria (Felipponea) elongata) by W. H. Dall in 1921.

Dall's original text (the type description) reads as follows:

Distribution 
This species occurs in the Uruguay River in Uruguay.

References 
This article incorporates public domain text from reference.

Ampullariidae
Gastropods described in 1921